The Awinmul were an indigenous Australian people of the Northern Territory.

Country
The Awinmul1's traditional lands covered an estimated  of land from Brocks Creek to the Edith River and the headwaters of the Mary and Fergusson rivers.

History
A long and intense drought struck their region in the early 20th century, resulting in a drastic reduction of the Awinmul. The remnant of survivors were subsequently absorbed by the Wulwulam.

Alternative names
 Awinnmull.
 Awinmil.

Notes

Citations

Sources

Aboriginal peoples of the Northern Territory